Anolis argillaceus, the Cuban dark bark anole or bay anole, is a species of lizard in the family Dactyloidae. The species is found in Cuba.

References

Anoles
Reptiles of Cuba
Endemic fauna of Cuba
Reptiles described in 1862
Taxa named by Edward Drinker Cope